Engineering the Dead is the second album by the death metal band Aborted. It was released on 6 August 2001 and re-released in 2008.

Track listing

2008 re-release bonus tracks

Personnel
Sven "Svencho" de Caluwé – vocals
Thijs De Cloedt – lead guitar
Niek Verstraete – guitar
Koen Verstraete – bass
Frank Rousseau – drums

References

Aborted (band) albums
2001 debut albums